Top Country Albums is a chart that ranks the top-performing country music albums in the United States, published by Billboard.  In 2016, 22 different albums topped the chart; placings were based on electronic point of sale data from retail outlets.

In the issue of Billboard dated January 2, Chris Stapleton was at number one with Traveller, its fifth week in the top spot.  The album held the top spot for the first nine weeks of 2016 and made intermittent returns to the top spot for the remainder of the year, spending a total of 20 weeks atop the chart during the twelve months.  No other act spent more than four weeks at number one in 2016.  Travellers first run of the year in the top spot was ended by Joey + Rory's first chart-topping album Hymns That Are Important to Us, which reached number one in the issue of Billboard dated March 5;  Joey Feek, the female half of the husband-and-wife duo, died on March 4 at the age of 40.

Several other acts topped the chart for the first time in 2016, beginning with Sturgill Simpson, who spent a single week at number one in May with A Sailor's Guide to Earth, which would go on to win the award for Best Country Album.  Maren Morris and Kane Brown both topped the chart with their respective debut albums Hero and Kane Brown, as did Steven Tyler, who released his first solo album We're All Somebody from Somewhere after more than 40 years as the lead singer of the hard rock band Aerosmith and took it to the top of the country albums listing.  Jon Pardi also reached number one for the first time.  Garth Brooks was the only artist to top the chart with two different albums during the year, both of which reached the top spot in December.  He spent a single week at number one in the issue of Billboard dated December 3 with Christmas Together, a collaboration with his wife Trisha Yearwood, and four weeks later returned to the top of the chart with the compilation album The Ultimate Collection.  One album reached number one on both the Top Country Albums chart and the all-genre Billboard 200 in 2016: Jason Aldean held the top spot on both listings in the issue of Billboard dated October 1 with They Don't Know.

Chart history

See also
2016 in music
List of number-one country singles of 2016 (U.S.)

References

2016
United States Country Albums